Cazale also Cazales, is a village in Haiti. It is located in a mountainous region more than 70 kilometers from Port-au-Prince, the capital. It is the main population center of the Polish community in Haiti, called La Pologne (Poland). The name Cazale may have originated as kay Zalewski, meaning "home of Zalewski" (a popular Polish surname). The village is populated by descendants of Polish soldiers sent by Napoleon in 1802.

References

Polish diaspora in North America
Polish communities
Populated places in Haiti